Cola porphyrantha is a species of flowering plant in the family Malvaceae. It is found only in Kenya.

References

porphyrantha
Endemic flora of Kenya
Endangered flora of Africa
Taxonomy articles created by Polbot